Deh Now-e Sofla or Deh-e Now-e Sofla or Deh Now-ye Sofla or Dehnow-e Sofla or Deh Now Sofla or Dehnow-ye Sofla may refer to:
 Deh Now-ye Sofla, Kiar, Chaharmahal and Bakhtiari Province
 Dehnow-ye Sofla, Kuhrang, Chaharmahal and Bakhtiari Province
 Deh Now-e Sofla, Hamadan